The Dry River is a  tributary of the North River in the U.S. state of Virginia. It flows entirely within Rockingham County, rising within the George Washington National Forest east of the West Virginia border and flowing south to the North River at Bridgewater. Via the North River, it is part of the Shenandoah River system, flowing to the Potomac River.

See also
List of rivers of Virginia

References
Notes

Bibliography

USGS Hydrologic Unit Map - State of Virginia (1974)

Rivers of Virginia
Tributaries of the Shenandoah River
Rivers of Rockingham County, Virginia